was a district located in Fukui Prefecture, Japan.

As of October 1, 2005, the district had an estimated population of 92,312 and a density of 439.77 persons per km2. The total area is 209.91 km2.

Towns
Prior to its dissolution, the district consisted of six towns:

 Awara
 Harue
 Kanazu
 Maruoka
 Mikuni
 Sakai

History

Recent mergers
 On March 1, 2004 - The former town of Awara absorbed the town of Kanazu to form the city of Awara.
 On March 20, 2006 - The former town of Sakai absorbed the towns of Harue, Maruoka and Mikuni to form the city of Sakai. Sakai District was dissolved as a result of this merger.

Former districts of Fukui Prefecture